Boomerang is an Australian pay television channel owned by Warner Bros. Discovery under its International division. It is a sister service of Cartoon Network.

History and branding
The Australian feed of the Boomerang Asia service was launched on 14 March 2004, as a part of the Foxtel Digital launch with a line-up very similar to that of the American and British version. Originally devoted to classic animation from studios such as Warner Bros., Metro-Goldwyn-Mayer and Hanna-Barbera, the channel has since expanded to include more contemporary programming including Poochini. This channel is available as a free trial in a subscription entertainment package on Fetch TV by some ISPs and was added 26 January 2017.

On 1 December 2012, Boomerang launched a refreshed look, using the logo used by Boomerang UK and other European countries, and converted to 16:9 aspect ratio.

On 3 November 2014, Boomerang received a new logo and branding as part of a global rebranding effort. In late 2014, Boomerang had launched Art&Graft redesign which by 2015 came to Asian and Oceanian territories, the United States, and later to Europe, the Middle East and Africa.

On 24 April 2021, the channel was discontinued on Fetch TV, alongside its sister channel Cartoon Network.

Programming

Current programming

 Baby Looney Tunes
 Batwheels
 Brave Bunnies
 Bugs Bunny Builders
 Bunnicula
 Camp Lazlo
 Chowder
 Dorothy and the Wizard of Oz
 Esme & Roy
 Foster's Home for Imaginary Friends
 Mumfie
 New Looney Tunes
 Petronix Defenders
 Ranger Rob
 Taffy
 Talking Tom and Friends
 Tom and Jerry Tales
 The Tom and Jerry Show (1975 TV series)
 What's New, Scooby-Doo?

Former programming

 The Adventures Of Bottle Top Bill
 ALF: The Animated Series
 Alice and Lewis
 Angelo Rules
 A Pup Named Scooby-Doo
 Astro Boy
 The Banana Splits
 Barbie Dreamhouse Adventures
 The Batman
 Be Cool, Scooby-Doo!
 Ben 10
 Ben 10: Omniverse
 Best Furry Friends
 Captain Caveman
 Care Bears
 Care Bears: Welcome to Care-a-Lot
 Casper's Scare School
 Cow and Chicken
 Codename: Kids Next Door
 Dexter's Laboratory
 DreamWorks Dragons
 Duck Dodgers
 Dynomutt, Dog Wonder
 Fraggle Rock
 The Flintstones
 The Garfield Show
 Grizzy & the Lemmings
 Help! It's The Hair Bear Bunch
 Hong Kong Phooey
 Horrid Henry
 Horseland
 Huckleberry Hound
 Inspector Gadget (1983 TV series)
 Inspector Gadget (2015 TV series)
 The Jetsons
 Jimmy Two-Shoes
 Johnny Bravo
 Josie and the Pussycats
 Krypto the Superdog
 LEGO Friends
 Legion Of Superheroes
 Lippy the Lion and Hardy Har Har
 Looney Tunes
 The Looney Tunes Show
 Magilla Gorilla
 Matt's Monsters
 Monchhichi Tribe
 Mr. Bean: The Animated Series
 Mush Mush And The Mushables
 My Knight and Me
 My Little Pony: Friendship Is Magic
 My Little Pony: Pony Life
 The New Adventures of Tom and Jerry
 Oggy and the Cockroaches
 Out of Jimmy's Head
 Ozie Boo!
 Pat the Dog
 The Perils of Penelope Pitstop
 Pingu In The City
 The Pink Panther
 Pink Panther and Pals
 Pixie and Dixie and Mr. Jinks
 Popeye
 Postman Pat
 The Powerpuff Girls
 Powerpuff Girls Z
 Quick Draw McGraw
 Sabrina the Teenage Witch
 Samurai Jack
 The Scooby and Scrappy-Doo Show
 Scooby-Doo and Guess Who?
 Scooby-Doo! Mystery Incorporated
 The Scooby-Doo Show
 Scooby-Doo, Where Are You!
 Sheep in the Big City
 The Smurfs
 Snagglepuss
 Strawberry Shortcake
 Strawberry Shortcake's Berry Bitty Adventures
 The Sylvester & Tweety Mysteries
 Thomas & Friends (series 12-13 only)
 Time Squad
 Tom and Jerry
 Tom & Jerry Kids
 The Tom and Jerry Show (2014 TV series)
 Tom and Jerry Tales
 Top Cat
 We Bare Bears
 Winx Club
 Yabba Dabba Dinosaurs
 Yogi Bear

Logos

See also
 Boomerang (TV network)

References

External links
 

English-language television stations in Australia
Television channels and stations established in 2004
Boomerang (TV network)
Children's television channels in Australia
Children's television networks
Turner International Australia
Warner Bros. Discovery Asia-Pacific